Jean D. Wagenius (born October 1941) is an American politician who served as a member of the Minnesota House of Representatives from 1987 to 2021. A member of the Democratic–Farmer–Labor Party (DFL), she represented District 63B, which includes portions of the city of Minneapolis in Hennepin County, which is part of the Twin Cities metropolitan area. She is an attorney and worked previously as a staff attorney for the Minnesota Court of Appeals.

Early life and education
Wagenius earned a Bachelor of Arts degree from George Washington University in 1963 and a Juris Doctor from William Mitchell College of Law in 1983. She also attended the Jane Addams College of Social Work at the University of Illinois in the 1960s.

Career 
Wagenius worked at Peace Corps Headquarters, selecting and placing new volunteers.

Wagenius was first elected in 1986 and was reelected every two years until 2020. Due to legislative redistricting in 1992, her district was known as 63A from 1993 to 2003.

References

External links 

 Rep. Wagenius Web Page
 Minnesota Public Radio Votetracker: Rep. Jean Wagenius
 Project Votesmart - Rep. Jean Wagenius Profile
 Jean Wagenius Campaign Web Site

1941 births
Living people
Politicians from Minneapolis
Democratic Party members of the Minnesota House of Representatives
William Mitchell College of Law alumni
Minnesota lawyers
Women state legislators in Minnesota
Lawyers from Minneapolis
21st-century American politicians
21st-century American women politicians